An anointing brush is a liturgical brush used in the Byzantine Rite to administer one of the sacred oils: chrism, oil of catechumens, or oil of the sick.

In Post-Soviet Russia the anointing brush is used by the self-proclaimed "Orthodox psychotherapist" Grigorii Grigoriev in a ritual for alcoholic patients. Grigoriev has preserved some of Soviet psychiatrist Alexander Dovzhenko's ritual structures but has replaced all biomedical representations with official religious elements from Russian Orthodoxy. After consulting with the patients, Grigoriev reads a prayer over them in Church Slavonic, then intones declaring them free of cravings for alcohol. The anointing brush is used to mark the conclusion the ritual by touching the patient upon their head with the brush.

References

Byzantine Rite
Christian worship and liturgy
Eastern Orthodoxy
Eastern Orthodox liturgy
Eastern Christian liturgical objects
Russian Orthodoxy